Parornix is a genus of moths in the family Gracillariidae.

Species

Parornix acuta Triberti, 1980
Parornix alni Kumata, 1965
Parornix alpicola (Wocke, 1877)
Parornix alta (Braun, 1925)
Parornix altaica Noreika & Bidzilya, 2006
Parornix ampliatella (Stainton, 1850)
Parornix anglicella (Stainton, 1850)
Parornix anguliferella (Zeller, 1847)
Parornix arbitrella (Dietz, 1907)
Parornix arbutifoliella (Dietz, 1907)
Parornix asiatica Noreika, 1991
Parornix atripalpella Wahlström, 1979
Parornix betulae (Stainton, 1854)
Parornix bifurca Triberti, 1998
Parornix boreasella (Clemens, 1864)
Parornix carpinella (Frey, 1863)
Parornix compressa Triberti, 1990
Parornix compsumpta Triberti, 1987
Parornix concussa (Meyrick, 1933)
Parornix conspicuella (Dietz, 1907)
Parornix cotoneasterella Kuznetzov, 1978
Parornix crataegifoliella (Clemens, 1860)
Parornix devoniella (Stainton, 1850)
Parornix dubitella (Dietz, 1907)
Parornix ermolaevi Kuznetzov, 1979
Parornix errantella (Walsingham, 1897)
Parornix extrema Kuznetzov & Baryschnikova, 2003
Parornix fagivora (Frey, 1861)
Parornix festinella (Clemens, 1860)
Parornix finitimella (Zeller, 1850)
Parornix fragilella Triberti, 1981
Parornix fumidella Kuznetzov, 1979
Parornix geminatella (Packard, 1869)
Parornix hastata Triberti, 1990
Parornix impressipenella (Bilimek, 1867)
Parornix incerta Triberti, 1982
Parornix innotata (Walsingham, 1907)
Parornix inusitatumella (Chambers, 1873)
Parornix kalmiella (Dietz, 1907)
Parornix kugitangi Noreika, 1991
Parornix kumatai Ermolaev, 1993
Parornix loganella (Stainton, 1848)
Parornix loricata Triberti, 1998
Parornix maliphaga Kuznetzov, 1979
Parornix maura Triberti, 1998
Parornix melanotella (Dietz, 1907)
Parornix micrura Walsingham, 1914
Parornix minor Kumata, 1965
Parornix mixta (Triberti, 1980)
Parornix multimaculata (Matsumura, 1931)
Parornix obliterella (Dietz, 1907)
Parornix oculata (Triberti, 1979)
Parornix ornatella Triberti, 1981
Parornix peregrinaella (Darlington, 1949)
Parornix persicella Danilevsky, 1955
Parornix petiolella (Frey, 1863)
Parornix polygrammella (Wocke, 1862)
Parornix preciosella (Dietz, 1907)
Parornix quadripunctella (Clemens, 1861)
Parornix retrusella Kuznetzov, 1979
Parornix scoticella (Stainton, 1850)
Parornix spiraeifoliella (Braun, 1918)
Parornix strobivorella (Dietz, 1907)
Parornix subfinitimella Kuznetzov, 1956
Parornix szocsi (Gozmány, 1952)
Parornix tenella (Rebel, 1919)
Parornix texanella (Busck, 1906)
Parornix torquillella (Zeller, 1850)
Parornix traugotti Svensson, 1976
Parornix trepidella (Clemens, 1860)
Parornix turcmeniella Kuznetzov, 1956
Parornix vicinella (Dietz, 1907)

External links
 Global Taxonomic Database of Gracillariidae (Lepidoptera)
 
 

 
Gracillariinae
Gracillarioidea genera